The R367 road is a regional road in Ireland linking Ballymoe on the N60 with the N5 in Tulsk, all in County Roscommon. It passes through Ballintober, Knockalaghta and Castleplunket en route.

See also
Roads in Ireland
National primary road
National secondary road

References
Roads Act 1993 (Classification of Regional Roads) Order 2006 – Department of Transport

Regional roads in the Republic of Ireland
Roads in County Roscommon